William Valentine Black (21 February 1832 – 1 April 1927) was a nineteenth-century Utah pioneer, and one of the early settlers of Manti, Spring City, Rockville, and Deseret, Utah.  He was also a close friend of Chief Kanosh the leader of the Pahvant band of the Ute people.  He was also the first branch president of the LDS Church in Deseret, Utah.

Black "was one of several Irishmen instrumental in the formation of the dam and irrigation systems in Utah.  He assisted in locating dams and canals at Abraham, Oasis, Hinckley, and Deseret and was also president of the Deseret Irrigation Company in southern Utah."

William's brother, Joseph Smith Black, was only the second white man to explore Zion National Park, and the first white person to settle in the Park in 1861.

Notes

1832 births
Irish emigrants to the United States (before 1923)
Converts to Mormonism
American leaders of the Church of Jesus Christ of Latter-day Saints
1927 deaths
People of the Utah War
People of Utah Territory
Latter Day Saints from Utah